This is a list of numbered municipal roads in Kingston and Frontenac County, Ontario.

The City of Kingston is a single-tier municipality not under the jurisdiction of an upper-tier municipality such as Frontenac County and thus, is outside of the geographic limits of Frontenac County for municipal purposes. For geographic purposes however, Kingston is within the geographic limits of Frontenac County. The City of Kingston forms part of the county's census division.

The numbered roads in this list are not under the jurisdiction of Frontenac County (only their numbers are, for coordination); the responsibility for their maintenance is with the individual townships (and City of Kingston). As a result, the "flowerpot" municipal road shields are signed with the name of the township, such as Central Frontenac, Kingston or Wolfe Island (for Frontenac Islands Township). South Frontenac Township makes reference to its numbered township highways as Township Road n in law.

Main List

References

Frontenac
Transport in Frontenac County